The Goodfellow's Christmas Eve is a 1911 silent film short starring Francis X. Bushman and produced by the Essanay Studios. It was released through the General Film Company.

Cast
Francis X. Bushman - James Sawyer
Harry Cashman -
Eva Prout -
Lily Branscombe -
Frank Dayton -
William Walters -
Whitney Raymond -

See also
Francis X. Bushman filmography

References

External links
 The Goodfellow's Christmas Eve at IMDb.com

1911 films
Essanay Studios films
1911 short films
American silent short films
American black-and-white films
1910s American films
1910s English-language films